Hanlon's razor is an adage or rule of thumb that states, "Never attribute to malice that which is adequately explained by stupidity." Known in several other forms, it is a philosophical razor that suggests a way of eliminating unlikely explanations for human behavior. It is probably named after Robert J. Hanlon, who submitted the statement to Murphy's Law Book Two (1980). Similar statements have been recorded since at least the 18th century.

Origin
A similar quotation appears in Robert A. Heinlein's novella Logic of Empire (1941). The character "Doc" in Heinlein's story described the "devil theory" fallacy, explaining, "You have attributed conditions to villainy that simply result from stupidity."

The quotation as such was a submission credited in print to Robert J. Hanlon of Scranton, Pennsylvania, for a compilation of various jokes related to Murphy's law that were published in Arthur Bloch's Murphy's Law Book Two: More Reasons Why Things Go Wrong! (1980). It is unknown whether Hanlon knew of Heinlein's story or whether he independently constructed the phrase.

Hanlon's razor became well-known after its inclusion in the Jargon File, a glossary of computer programmer slang, since 1990.
Later that same year, the Jargon File editors noted lack of knowledge about the term's derivation and the existence of a similar epigram by William James, though this was possibly intended as a reference to William James Laidlay. In 1996, the Jargon File entry on Hanlon's Razor noted the existence of 
the phrase in Heinlein's novella, with speculation that Hanlon's Razor might be a corruption of "Heinlein's Razor". The link to Murphy's law was described in a pair of 2001 blog entries by Quentin Stafford-Fraser, citing emails from Joseph E. Bigler. Subsequently, in 2002, the Jargon File entry noted the same.
Current Jargon File refers to it as a "Murphyism".

The name was inspired by Occam's razor.

Other variations of the idea
Earlier attributions to the idea go back to at least the 18th century.   Johann Wolfgang von Goethe wrote in the first entry of his influential epistolary novel The Sorrows of Young Werther (1774, first English translation 1779): "[...] " ('[...] misunderstandings and lethargy perhaps produce more wrong in the world than deceit and malice do. At any rate, the latter two are certainly rarer.')  Another variation appears in the Wheels of Chance by H.G. Wells:There is very little deliberate wickedness in the world. The stupidity of our selfishness gives much the same results indeed, but in the ethical laboratory it shows a different nature.A similar quote is also misattributed to Napoleon. Andrew Roberts, in his biography of Winston Churchill, quotes from Churchill's correspondence with King George VI in February 1943 regarding disagreements with Charles De Gaulle: His 'insolence ... may be founded on stupidity rather than malice.

See also

 
 Apophenia
 Argument from incredulity
 Clarke's three laws
 Dunning–Kruger effect
 Finagle's law
 Good faith
 Hitchens's razor
 Idiot-proof
 Law of triviality
 Occam's razor
 Peter principle
 Presumption of innocence
 Principle of charity
 Sturgeon's law

References

Adages
Principles
Razors (philosophy)
Intention